Jacques Bureau,  (July 9, 1860 – January 23, 1933) was a Canadian politician.

Born in Trois-Rivières, Canada East, the son of J. Napoleon Bureau and Sophie Gingras, Bureau was educated at Nicolet College and received a Bachelor of Laws degree in 1881 from Laval University. A lawyer, he was elected to the House of Commons of Canada for the riding of Three Rivers and St. Maurice in the 1900 federal election. A Liberal, he was re-elected in 1904, 1908, 1911, 1917, and 1921. From 1907 to 1911, he was the Solicitor General of Canada. From 1921 to 1925, he was the Minister of Customs and Excise. In 1925, after his involvement in the King-Byng Affair, he was called to the Senate of Canada representing the senatorial division of La Salle, Quebec. He served until his death in 1933.

References
 
 

1860 births
1933 deaths
Canadian senators from Quebec
Laurier Liberals
Liberal Party of Canada MPs
Liberal Party of Canada senators
Members of the House of Commons of Canada from Quebec
Members of the King's Privy Council for Canada
People from Trois-Rivières
Solicitors General of Canada
Canadian King's Counsel